The 2010–11 Icelandic Hockey League season was the 23rd season of the Icelandic Hockey League, the top level of ice hockey in Iceland. SA Vikingar defeated Hunar in the championship round, 3-0.

Regular season

Final 
 SA Vikingar - Ísknattleiksfélagið Björninn 3:0 (4:3, 6:1, 5:3)

References

External links 
 Icelandic Ice Hockey Federation

Icelandic Hockey League
Icelandic Hockey League seasons
2013–14 in Icelandic ice hockey